Werner Oswald is a former Swiss curler.

At the national level, he is a two-time Swiss men's champion curler. He competed for Switzerland in two .

Teams

References

External links
 

Living people
Swiss male curlers
Swiss curling champions
Year of birth missing (living people)
Place of birth missing (living people)